Rikard Jorgovanić (Mali Tabor, 1853 – Zagreb, 1880) was a Croatian writer. As the son of a Bohemian immigrant of German ethnicity, and his Croatianized last name was calqued after German Flieder. He enrolled in the public school of Varaždin, and later continued his education in Zagreb. His poetical verses are characterized by intrigue and intimacy. While he is known as the first writer of fantasy in Croatia, his work also differs from the usual pro-nationalistic ideology.

Bibliography 

List of works done during his life as a writer:

 On the Threshold (Na pragu)
 Holy Winged One (Svetokrilac)
 Night (Noć)
 In the Silent Sleeping Night (U tihoj drijemajućoj noći)
 The Children of the Mill (Mlinarska djeca)
 Dada (Dada)
 Love upon the Catafalque (Ljubav na odru)
 A Wife and a Lover (Žena i ljubovca)

References 

1853 births
1880 deaths
Croatian male poets
Croatian people of German descent
Croatian people of Czech descent
19th-century Croatian poets
19th-century male writers